William Gush (23 April 1813 – 28 February 1888) was an English portrait painter born near London.He lived at 40 Camden Square, Camden, London between 1860 and 1864.

Gallery

Works 
Charles Wesley
Sir John Harrison Yallop, late mayor of Norwich. (1833)
 Duke of Beaufort, in the uniform of the Gloucester Yeomanry Cavalry
Frederick Aaron,
 Abraham and Susannah Riddiford.
Lieutenant Colonel Townsend of the 14th Royal Light Dragoons
Reverend James Henry Monk Lord Bishop of Gloucester and Bristol, painted for the Bishop’s College in Clifton exhibited in 1842
the Richard White, 1st Earl of Bantry (1767–1851) exhibited in 1844.
Mrs Mills.
 Lieutenant General Sir William Fenwick Williams of Kars, Bart., KCB is
Charles Frederick Allison, the founder of the University.
 Charles Allison’s wife and daughter
 Reverend Humphrey Pickard
 Reverend John Beecham, the first president of the Wesleyan Conference of Eastern British America
 John Curwen, a writer on music.
Sir John Eardley Inglis
 Mrs Philip Vanderbyl
 At Lessons
and Blackberries
The New Song (1874)

References

External links 
 

1813 births
1888 deaths
19th-century English painters
English male painters
Painters from London
19th-century English male artists